The following lists events that happened during 2015 in Sri Lanka.

Incumbents
President: Mahinda Rajapaksa (until 9 January), Maithripala Sirisena (starting 9 January)
Prime Minister: Disanayaka Mudiyanselage Jayaratne (until 9 January), Ranil Wickremesinghe (starting 9 January)

Governors
 Central Province – Tikiri Kobbekaduwa (until 19 January); Surangani Ellawala (starting 27 January)
 Eastern Province – Mohan Wijewickrama (until January); Austin Fernando (starting January)
 North Central Province – Karunarathna Divulgane (until 27 January); P. B. Dissanayake (starting 27 January)
 Northern Province – G. A. Chandrasiri (until 27 January); H. M. G. S. Palihakkara (starting 27 January)
 North Western Province – Tissa Balalla (until 23 January); Amara Piyaseeli Ratnayake (starting 23 January)
 Sabaragamuwa Province – W. J. M. Lokubandara (until 27 January); Marshal Perera (starting 27 January)
 Southern Province – Kumari Balasuriya (until 23 January); Hemakumara Nanayakkara (starting 23 January)
 Uva Province – Nanda Mathew (until 27 January); M. P. Jayasinghe (starting 27 January)
 Western Province – Alavi Moulana (until 23 January); K. C. Logeswaran (starting 23 January)

Chief Ministers
 Central Province – Sarath Ekanayake 
 Eastern Province – M. N. Abdul Majeed (until 6 February); Ahamed Nazeer Zainulabdeen (starting 6 February)
 North Central Province – S. M. Ranjith (until 28 January); Peshala Jayarathne (starting 28 January)
 Northern Province – C. V. Vigneswaran 
 North Western Province – Dayasiri Jayasekara (until 8 September); Dharmasiri Dassanayake (starting 8 September)
 Sabaragamuwa Province – Maheepala Herath 
 Southern Province – Shan Wijayalal De Silva 
 Uva Province – 
 until 14 January: Shasheendra Rajapaksa
 14 January-September: Harin Fernando
 starting 15 September: Chamara Sampath Dassanayake 
 Western Province – Prasanna Ranatunga (until 4 May); Isura Devapriya (starting 4 May)

Events

January
 January 8 - Voters in Sri Lanka go to the polls for a presidential election with a tight contest predicted between President Mahinda Rajapaksa and challenger Maithripala Sirisena.
 January 9 - Mahinda Rajapaksa concedes defeat to Maithripala Sirisena in the presidential election.
 January 11 - The new Sri Lankan government announces that it will investigate allegations of a coup attempt by Mahinda Rajapaksa, in a bid to retain power after being defeated at the polls.

March
 18 March - Two Sri Lankan greats, Mahela Jayawardene and Kumar Sangakkara retired from One international cricket following the team's defeat against South Africa. Jayawardene ended 18 year old career as the fifth highest ODI run scorer of all time. Sangakkara ended 15 year career as second highest ODI scorer of all time.

May
 May 13 - Murder of S. Vithiya, a schoolgirl gang raped and murdered in Pungudutivu.

August
 15 August - Sri Lankan cricketer Kumar Sangakkara retired from all international cricket with his last Test match against India.

Deaths
 September 26 - Ana Seneviratne, former Sri Lankan Inspector-General of Police (b. 1927)

References

 
2010s in Sri Lanka
Sri Lanka
Sri Lanka
Years of the 21st century in Sri Lanka